Nantucket Sleighride is the second studio album by American hard rock band Mountain, released in January 1971 by Windfall Records in the US and by Island in the UK.

Songs 
The song and album title is a reference to the experience of being towed along in a boat by a harpooned whale (see Nantucket sleighride). Owen Coffin, to whom the song is dedicated, was a young seaman on the Nantucket whaler Essex, which was rammed and sunk by a sperm whale in 1820. In the aftermath of the wreck, Coffin was shot and eaten by his shipmates. The story of the Essex was recorded by its First Mate Owen Chase, one of eight survivors, in his 1821 Narrative of the Most Extraordinary and Distressing Shipwreck of the Whale-Ship Essex.

The instrumental break in the second half of the track uses the melody of the traditional Scottish song "The Parting Glass". The closing section of "Nantucket Sleighride" was used as the theme to the long-running British political television show Weekend World (1972-1988).

A cover version was recorded by British heavy metal band Quartz in 1980.

The song "Tired Angels" was dedicated to Jimi Hendrix, and "Travellin' In The Dark" was for Pappalardi's mother, Elia. "Taunta (Sammy's Tune)" was named after Pappalardi's pet poodle.

"Don't Look Around" was featured on the soundtrack of Pineapple Express (2008).

The album itself reached number 16 on the Billboard Hot 200 Album Chart in 1971.

Bonus tracks 
The bonus tracks on the 2004 edition include the Chuck Berry cover "Roll Over Beethoven" and the original song "Crossroader", which were released as the A- and B-sides of a promotional single in 1971. The latter was later released on Flowers of Evil (1971). Live versions of both tracks appeared on subsequent live releases, such as Mountain Live: The Road Goes Ever On (1972) and Twin Peaks (1974).

Track listing

Personnel 

 Leslie West – guitar, vocals
 Felix Pappalardi – bass, vocals, production
 Steve Knight – keyboards
 Corky Laing – drums, percussion

Additional personnel
 Bud Prager – executive producer
 Bob d'Orleans – recording engineer
 Tom Cachetta – assistant engineer
 Dave Ragno – assistant engineer
 Beverly Weinstein – art direction
 Gail Collins – cover design, painting, photography, visual director, calligraphy
 Mick Brigden – calligraphy

Charts

Certifications

References

External links 
 Mountain - Nantucket Sleighride (1971) album review by James Chrispell, credits & releases at AllMusic.com
 Mountain - Nantucket Sleighride (1971) album releases & credits at Discogs.com
 Mountain - Nantucket Sleighride (1971) album to be listened as stream at Play.Spotify.com
 

1971 albums
Mountain (band) albums
Island Records albums
Windfall Records albums
Albums produced by Felix Pappalardi